Joseph Peter O'Connell (10 December 1931 – 27 April 2013) was the Roman Catholic titular bishop of 'Sanctus Germanus' and auxiliary bishop of the Roman Catholic Archdiocese of Melbourne, Australia.

Ordained to the priesthood in 1957, O'Connell was named bishop in 1976 and retired in 2004.

Notes

1931 births
2013 deaths
20th-century Roman Catholic bishops in Australia
21st-century Roman Catholic bishops in Australia
Roman Catholic bishops of Melbourne